The 2014 F2000 Championship Series season was the ninth season of competition for the series. The season saw the introduction of Spectrum as a constructor.

Teams and drivers

Race calendar and results

Final standings

References

External links
 Official Series Website

F2000
F2000 Championship Series seasons